Stacy London (born May 25, 1969) is  an American stylist, fashion consultant, author, and magazine editor. She is known primarily for her time as co-host on What Not to Wear, a reality television program that featured wardrobe and appearance makeovers.

After graduating from Vassar College, London started her career as a fashion editor at Vogue and transitioned into being a stylist for celebrities and designers. She moved into television by co-hosting What Not to Wear with first Wayne Scot Lukas and then Clinton Kelly, and doing fashion reporting for Access Hollywood, The Early Show, and the Today Show. From 2009 to 2010, she was a celebrity spokesperson for Pantene, Woolite, Dr. Scholl's, and Riders by Lee. She co-owns Style for Hire and is the creative director of Westfield Style.

Early life
London was born in New York City on May 25, 1969. She is of Sicilian descent on her mother's side and Jewish descent on her father's side. Her mother, Joy Weinman, worked as a venture capitalist, and her father, Herbert London, was the president emeritus of the Hudson Institute. Her stepmother, Vicki Pops, is a romance novelist. In an interview with The Wall Street Journal, she said of her father, "We don't see eye to eye on that much politically [but] he did instill a certain sense of propriety and right and wrong in me, which plays into my fashion sensibility." While going to Vassar College, she double majored in 20th century philosophy and German literature and was a member of Phi Beta Kappa. It was during a summer internship in Paris in Christian Dior's PR department that she took a serious interest in pursuing a career in the fashion industry.

Career
London began her career as a fashion assistant at Vogue magazine and later became the senior fashion editor at Mademoiselle. She has styled fashion photos for other publications, including Italian D, Nylon, and Contents. London has styled for celebrities such as Kate Winslet and Liv Tyler, and on fashion shows for designers Rebecca Taylor, Ghost, and Vivienne Tam. London has worked on numerous advertising campaigns; her client roster includes Hanes, Wonderbra, Bali, Procter & Gamble, CoverGirl, Suave, Target, Levi Strauss & Co., Maytag, Swatch, Longines, and Calvin Klein.

London began co-hosting TLC's What Not to Wear in its inaugural season in 2003. In 2005, she and co-host Clinton Kelly wrote a book titled Dress Your Best. London is known for her love of high-heeled shoes, owning over 300 pairs. In a What Not to Wear "Best of 2005" look-back show, Clinton Kelly teased London by saying "...there are almost as many great moments as there are high heels in Stacy's wardrobe." In 2008, London also served as the host of her own talk show Shut Up! It's Stacy London! which was the pilot episode for Fashionably Late with Stacy London. London has done fashion reporting for Weekend Today, The Early Show, Good Day Live, and Access Hollywood. She is a frequent contributor on NBC's Today Show.

From 2009 to 2010, London was a spokesperson for Pantene, Woolite, Dr. Scholl's, and Riders by Lee. In addition to her hosting duties and endorsements, London and business partner Cindy McLaughlin co-founded Style for Hire—an online service that matches people with personal stylists that live in their area. The goal of the online agency is to bring personal styling services to average income people. Style for Hire was launched as a pilot on September 13, 2010, in Washington, D.C., to test the idea. The agency launched in its entirety on April 16, 2012. As of that date, there are 135 stylists in 24 cities. London is also the creative director for Westfield Style and the editor-in-chief of Westfield STYLE magazine. Westfield's Style Lounges are staffed by professional stylists from Style for Hire who provide free on-demand fashion consultations. There are three Style Lounges located at Westfield Garden State Plaza in New Jersey, Westfield Montgomery in Maryland, and Westfield Trumbull in Connecticut.

London was the executive producer of Big Brooklyn Style, a reality show about customer experiences at Lee Lee's Valise boutique in New York. The show premiered May 29, 2012 on TLC. In February 2013, she became an editor-at-large of Shape magazine. In her role, she will write a fashion column for the magazine every month. In March 2013, TLC announced that What Not to Wear would air its final season starting in July. London said of the experience "This show changed me and the trajectory of my life... I hope we touched [our contributors] as much as they touched me. I hope we touched our viewers." In January 2015, TLC announced that London would host Love, Lust, or Run, a show similar to her previous work, What Not to Wear. She was an official contributor on Season 19 of The View from 2015 to 2016.

Personal life
London lives in the Carroll Gardens neighborhood of New York City's Brooklyn borough. On December 31, 2019, she announced that she was in her first serious relationship with a woman, musician Cat Yezbak, and had been so for over a year. She wrote on Instagram, "So I used to date men. Now I date her."

London has suffered from psoriasis since childhood. Due to her experience growing up, she became a spokesperson for the National Psoriasis Foundation in 2007 and AbbVie's "Uncover Your Confidence" campaign in 2013. She is well known for her naturally-occurring gray streak in the front of her hair—known in the medical field as poliosis—which she has had since she was 11 years old. Her Pantene contract includes a "gray clause" that allows her to keep it.

In the early 1990s, London struggled with anorexia, binge eating, and other weight issues. In a 2007 interview with Sirens magazine, she said of the experience, "I have been every size in my life. I've been smaller than a zero, up through a size 16. I've had lots of issues with body image and weight my whole life and it really took a great deal of work to recognize that at all those weights, no matter how I felt, I could still find a dress that made me feel sexy and powerful."

In 2010, London was profiled by Time Out magazine in their article/photo series about the most stylish New Yorkers. That same year, she performed in the Off-Broadway play Love, Loss, and What I Wore, a series of monologues about women's clothes and their relationship to life events/memories. As of 2016, London has never been married and has no children. She discussed being single, the importance of personal style, and her past struggles with eating disorders in her second book, a memoir, titled The Truth About Style.

In December 2016, London underwent spinal fusion surgery to correct a chronic back problem, which required a six-month rehabilitation.

References

External links

Style for Hire at pinterest.com 
Uncover Your Confidence

American people of Italian descent
American people of Jewish descent
Vassar College alumni
American magazine editors
American fashion journalists
Television personalities from New York City
American women television personalities
1969 births
Living people
Fashion stylists
American women journalists
Trinity School (New York City) alumni
Journalists from New York City
Women magazine editors
People from Carroll Gardens, Brooklyn
LGBT women
American LGBT journalists
LGBT people from New York (state)
21st-century American women